The 1996–97 NBA season was the 29th season for the Phoenix Suns in the National Basketball Association. During the off-season, the Suns acquired Sam Cassell, Robert Horry, Mark Bryant and Chucky Brown from the Houston Rockets, and signed free agent Rex Chapman. However, the team struggled losing their first 13 games of the season, as Kevin Johnson missed the first eleven games with a hernia injury. After an 0–8 start, head coach Cotton Fitzsimmons resigned and was replaced by former Suns guard Danny Ainge, who led the team to a 40–34 finish. Along the way, there were many in-season moves such as trading Cassell, second-year star Michael Finley and A. C. Green, to the Dallas Mavericks in exchange for All-Star guard Jason Kidd, second-year center Loren Meyer and Tony Dumas, sending Horry along with Joe Kleine to the Los Angeles Lakers in exchange for former Suns forward Cedric Ceballos and Rumeal Robinson, who was released to free agency after a short stint with the team, and trading Brown to the Milwaukee Bucks in exchange for Darrin Hancock, who never played for the Suns and was released to free agency. 

The Suns held a 17–31 record at the All-Star break, but played above .500 for the remainder of the season. It was a season that would not be matched in terms of moves until both the 2014–15 and the 2015–16 seasons came and went. Still, the Suns finished fourth in the Pacific Division with a 40–42 record. This team would also be the first and only NBA team to start out the season with a 10+ losing streak, yet make it to the playoffs by the end of the season. Not only that, but they would also be the first team to record a 10+ game winning streak after recording a 10+ game losing streak earlier in the season, posting an 11-game winning streak between March and April. 

Johnson led the Suns with 20.1 points, 9.3 assists and 1.5 steals per game, while Chapman averaged 13.8 points per game, and sixth man Danny Manning provided the team with 13.5 points and 6.1 rebounds per game off the bench. In addition, Wesley Person contributed 13.5 points per game, and led the team with 171 three-point field goals, while Bryant provided with 9.3 points and 5.2 rebounds per game, but only played just 41 games due to a abdominal strain injury, and Hot Rod Williams averaged 8.0 points, 8.3 rebounds and 1.3 blocks per game.

As the #7 seed in the Western Conference, the Suns faced the 2nd-seeded Seattle SuperSonics in the Western Conference First Round of the playoffs, taking a 2–1 series lead, but then losing 2–3 in a closely contested series. Following the season, Person was traded to the Cleveland Cavaliers, and Wayman Tisdale retired.

Offseason

NBA Draft

The Suns used their first-round pick to select point guard Steve Nash from Santa Clara. Nash averaged 14.9 points, 3.1 rebounds and 4.5 assists per game in four years with the Broncos. On July 24, the Suns signed Nash to a three-year rookie contract for $3.2 million. He would spend his first two seasons with the Suns playing a limited role behind All-Star guards Kevin Johnson and Jason Kidd, before being traded to the Dallas Mavericks in 1998. Nash would later return to the franchise as a free agent in 2004, winning consecutive MVP awards in 2005 and 2006 and ultimately making it to the Phoenix Suns Ring of Honor on October 30, 2015.

The Suns received the 39th pick from a trade with the Detroit Pistons in 1994. With the pick they would select power forward Russ Millard from Iowa. Millard averaged 10.1 points and 5.3 rebounds per game in four years with the Hawkeyes. Millard would sign with Italian club Pallacanestro Varese before the season and would never play in the NBA.

The Suns used their second-round pick to select power forward Ben Davis from Arizona. Davis averaged 12.5 points and 8.1 rebounds per game in two years with the Wildcats. On September 25, the Suns signed Davis to a one-year rookie contract for $220,000. Davis spent much of the year on the injured reserve with a finger injury. He would appear in 20 games, average 1.5 points and 1.4 rebounds in 4.9 minutes a game. Davis would sign as a free agent with the New York Knicks after the season. He would later return to the Suns shortly in the 1999–2000 season, appearing in just five games before being waived.

Roster

Regular season

Standings

Record vs. opponents

Playoffs
The Suns came into the playoffs as the seventh seed, facing the 1996 Western Conference champion Seattle SuperSonics in the first round. In game one, Rex Chapman set a playoff record with 9 three-pointers, finishing the game with 42 points and leading the Suns to a 106–101 upset in Seattle. The Sonics responded with a 44-point blowout in game two, evening the series 1–1. The Suns recovered at home in game three. After an early 15-point deficit, Wesley Person led the team to a comeback 110–103 victory with 29 points and 10 rebounds. The Suns had a chance to close the series at home in game four. Behind by eleven points in the final two minutes of regulation, the Suns cut to lead to two before fouling Detlef Schrempf with 5.4 seconds remaining. Schrempf would miss the second of two free throws, giving the Sonics a 107–104 lead. Rex Chapman would respond with a famous turnaround three-pointer to send the game into overtime. The Sonics would outscore the Suns 15–8 in extra time to gain a 122–115 victory. The Suns would head back to Seattle tied 2–2 for a deciding fifth game. The Suns turned to small ball, starting four guards (Jason Kidd, Kevin Johnson, Rex Chapman and Wesley Person) along with center Hot Rod Williams. The Sonics would dominate the first half, leading by 22 at the break. A third quarter rally would bring the lead to eight, and a Wesley Person three-pointer to open the fourth quarter brought the lead to just five. But the Sonics would go on a 19–7 run in the final six minutes to claim a 116–92 victory.

Game log

|- align="center" bgcolor="#ccffcc"
| 1
| April 25
| @ Seattle
| W 106–101
| Rex Chapman (42)
| Kevin Johnson (7)
| Jason Kidd (10)
| KeyArena17,072
| 1–0
|- align="center" bgcolor="#ffcccc"
| 2
| April 27
| @ Seattle
| L 78–122
| Rex Chapman (18)
| Wesley Person (10)
| Jason Kidd (8)
| KeyArena17,072
| 1–1
|- align="center" bgcolor="#ccffcc"
| 3
| April 29
| Seattle
| W 110–103
| Wesley Person (29)
| Wesley Person (10)
| Jason Kidd (10)
| America West Arena19,023
| 2–1
|- align="center" bgcolor="#ffcccc"
| 4
| May 1
| Seattle
| L 115–122 (OT)
| Johnson, Kidd (23)
| Danny Manning (10)
| Jason Kidd (14)
| America West Arena19,023
| 2–2
|- align="center" bgcolor="#ffcccc"
| 5
| May 3
| @ Seattle
| L 92–116
| Wesley Person (26)
| Kidd, Person (8)
| Jason Kidd (7)
| KeyArena17,072
| 2–3
|-

Awards and honors

Week/Month
Kevin Johnson was named Player of the Week for games played March 24 through March 30.
Kevin Johnson was named Player of the Month for April.

All-Star
This was only the third season in franchise history that the Suns were not represented in the All-Star Game, after the 1986 and 1988 seasons.
Steve Nash was selected to compete for the Western Conference in the Rookie Challenge.

Season
Kevin Johnson finished 17th in MVP voting.
Danny Manning finished seventh in Sixth Man of the Year voting.

Injuries/Missed games
10/31/96: Kevin Johnson: Abdominal hernia; placed on injured reserve until November 24
10/31/96: Mark Bryant: Torn knee cartilage; placed on injured reserve until December 6
10/31/96: Hot Rod Williams: Toe surgery; placed on injured list until November 26
11/14/96: Sam Cassell: Flu; did not play
11/23/96: Wayman Tisdale: Shoulder tendinitis; placed on injured list until December 30
11/26/96: Ben Davis: Finger ligament damage; placed on injured reserve until January 12
11/26/96: Sam Cassell: Personal reasons; did not play
11/27/96: Sam Cassell: Personal reasons; did not play
11/29/96: Sam Cassell: Personal reasons; did not play
12/06/96: Darrin Hancock: Bilateral knee bruises; placed on injured reserve until waived on December 10
12/21/96: Joe Kleine: Back spasms; did not play
12/28/96: Kevin Johnson: Flu; did not play
12/30/96: Tony Dumas: Injured finger; did not play
12/30/96: Jason Kidd: Collarbone hairline fracture; placed on injured list until December 14
01/06/97: Robert Horry: Two-game team suspension (threw towel at coach Danny Ainge); out until traded on January 10
01/10/97: Rex Chapman: Sprained ankle; did not play
01/12/97: Tony Dumas: Bruised knee; placed on injured list until April 20
01/13/97: Mark Bryant: Abdominal strain; did not play
01/13/97: Rex Chapman: Sprained ankle; did not play
01/14/97: Mark Bryant: Abdominal strain; did not play
01/14/97: Rex Chapman: Sprained ankle; did not play
01/18/97: Mark Bryant: Abdominal strain; did not play
01/29/97: Rex Chapman: Fractured finger; placed on injured reserve until March 2
02/11/97: Hot Rod Williams: Flu; did not play
02/26/97: Danny Manning: Sore leg; did not play
03/02/97: Ben Davis: Injured finger; placed on injured reserve until March 13
03/09/97: Mark Bryant: Bruised foot; did not play
03/11/97: Mark Bryant: Bruised foot; did not play
03/13/97: Mark Bryant: Bruised foot; did not play
03/13/97: Loren Meyer: Strained lower back; placed on injured list until March 25
03/17/97: Mark Bryant: Bruised foot; placed on injured reserve until April 20
03/22/97: Cedric Ceballos: Bruised knee; did not play
03/26/97: Cedric Ceballos: Bruised knee; did not play
03/28/97: Cedric Ceballos: Bruised knee; did not play
03/28/97: Wayman Tisdale: Personal reasons; did not play
03/30/97: Wayman Tisdale: Personal reasons; did not play
04/02/97: Wayman Tisdale: Personal reasons; did not play
04/05/97: Ben Davis: Injured finger; placed on injured reserve until April 20
04/15/97: Wesley Person: Flu; did not play
04/18/97: Wesley Person: Flu; did not play
04/19/97: Danny Manning: Injured foot; did not play

Player statistics

Season

* – Stats with the Suns.
† – Minimum 300 field goals made.
^ – Minimum 82 three-pointers made.
# – Minimum 125 free throws made.
+ – Minimum 50 games played.

Playoffs

# – Minimum 10 free throws made.

Transactions

Trades

Free agents

Additions

Subtractions

Player Transactions Citation:

References

 Suns on Database Basketball
 Suns on Basketball Reference

 

Phoenix Suns seasons